Channel 24 or TV24 may refer to several television and radio stations:
 Channel 24 (Bangladesh), a Bengali-language television channel in Bangladesh
 Channel 24 (Israel), a Hebrew-language television channel in Israel
 Channel 24 (Pakistan), an Urdu-language television channel in Pakistan
 24 Kanal, a Ukrainian-language television channel in Ukraine
 TV24 (India), a Hindi-language television news channel in India
 WEAC TV24, an East Alabama television news station
 ABC News 24,  an Australian 24-hour news channel launched and owned by the Australian Broadcasting Corporation
 Nederland 24, a number of specialty digital television channels from Netherlands Public Broadcasting
 24ore.tv, a financial news TV channel in Italy 2001–2007
 Channels TV 24, a 24-hour overseas news channel from Nigeria
 Channel24, a South African website operated by News24
 Radio Norge, a Norwegian radio channel formerly known as Kanal 24

Canada
The following television stations broadcast on digital channel 24 (UHF frequencies covering 530-536 MHz) in Canada:
 CHKL-DT in Kelowna, British Columbia
 CICO-DT-24 in Ottawa, Ontario
 CIVS-DT in Sherbrooke, Quebec

The following television stations operate on virtual channel 24 in Canada:
 CICO-DT-24 in Ottawa, Ontario
 CIVS-DT in Sherbrooke, Quebec

Mexico
The following television stations broadcast on virtual channel 24 in Mexico:
 XHPBQR-TDT in Querétaro, Querétaro
 XHZHZ-TDT in Zacatecas, Zacatecas

See also
 Channel 24 TV stations in Mexico
 Channel 24 digital TV stations in the United States
 Channel 24 virtual TV stations in the United States
 Channel 24 low-power TV stations in the United States
 Kanal 24 (disambiguation)
 24 (disambiguation)

24